The following is a list of the MTV Europe Music Award winners and nominees for Best Dutch & Belgian Act.

See also 
 MTV Europe Music Award for Best Dutch Act
 MTV Europe Music Award for Best Belgian Act

MTV Europe Music Awards
Dutch music awards
Belgian music awards
Awards established in 2004